Bernard Chiarelli (born 24 February 1934), is a former French footballer who played as midfielder. He won one cap for France, against Switzerland in 1958.

Honours
1958 FIFA World Cup third place with France

References

External links
 
 

1934 births
Living people
Sportspeople from Valenciennes
Association football midfielders
French footballers
France international footballers
Valenciennes FC players
RC Lens players
Lille OSC players
CS Sedan Ardennes players
Ligue 1 players
1958 FIFA World Cup players
French football managers
French sportspeople of Italian descent
Footballers from Hauts-de-France